Greenland Whalefishers , named after the irish traditional folk tune The Greenland Whale Fisheries, is a Norwegian folk punk band established in 1994, playing music influenced by Celtic traditional music combined with British punk. The musical style of this type of music is also referred to as celtic punk and paddy rock. Greenland Whalefishers are one of the founders of the Celtic punk movement, albeit 10 years after The Pogues.

Band members
Current members
Arvid Grov - Vocals
Ørjan Risan - Drums
Ronny Terum - Mandoline, Banjo, Bouzouki
Agnes Skollevoll - Tin Whistle
Atle-Hjørn Øien - Bass
Odin Døssland - Fiddle
Stig Blindheim - Guitar
Stig Bruhjell - Electric Guitar

Former members
Kjellaug Borthen
Trond Eikemo
Bjørn Helgesen
Kristian Malmo
Stig Blindheim
Gunnar Grov
Tommy Bårdsen
Terje Schumann-Olsen
Trond Olsen
Alexander Bjotveit
Jon-Erik Kvåle Øien

Discography

Albums
 The Mainstreet Sword (1996)
 Loboville (2001)
 Streets of Salvation (2004)
 Loboville (Enhanced including video footage) (2005)
 The Mainstreet Sword (Enhanced including video footage) (2005)
 Down and Out (2006)
 Amazing Space (b-sides and other crap) (2008)
 Joining Forces (with SMZB) (2008)
 Songs from the Bunker (2010)
 Live At Farmer Phil's Festival (2012)
 The Thirsty Cave (2015)
 Based On a True Story (2019)

EPs
 Maybe The Salvation Starts Here (2004)
 Hit the Ground (2006)
 Looney Tunes (2014)

Singles
 Mary B. (Good) (1994)
 The Clown (1996)
 T-Bell's Blues (1998)
 Johnny Lee Roth (2001)
 Punk Shanty (2006)
 K Says (2019) (digital)
 Darkness (2019) (digital)
 St. Patrick's Day Drinking (2022) (digital)
 Celtic Punk (2022) (digital)

Film
 20 Years Of Waiting (Documentary) (2014)
Touring Ireland (Documentary) (2016)
Barely Alive on the Inside (Live Concert Documentary) (2020)
Waiting For the World (Concert Documentary) (2021)

Music in popular culture
Greenland Whalefishers contributed with their song "Rocky Road To London" to the movie The Boondock Saints II: All Saints Day.

Reviews
The Thirsty Cave review by Paddy Rock Radio (USA)
The Thirsty Cave review by Celtic Folk Punk (Sp)
Looney Tunes EP review by London Celtic Punks (UK)
Lonney Tunes EP review by ReadJunk (NY, USA)
20 Years Of Waiting Documentary Movie review by Shite 'n' Onions (USA)
20 Years Of Waiting Documentary Movie review by PaddyRock.com (USA)
20 Years Of Waiting Documentary Movie review by ReadJunk (USA)
Live At Farmer Phil's Festival review by Paddy Rock Radio
Live At Farmer Phil's Festival review by Punk.ie
Live At Farmer Phil's Festival review by ReadJunk
Live At Farmer Phil's Festival review by Shite N' Onions
Live At Farmer Phil's Festival review by Celtic Rock Music Germany
Streets of Salvation review by Shite N' Onions
Streets of Salvation review by Folkworld
Down N' Out review by Shite N' Onions
Songs From The Bunker review by Read Junk

References

External links
 Greenland Whalefishers official website

Norwegian musical groups
Musical groups established in 1994
Celtic punk groups
1994 establishments in Norway